Straneotia freyi, the Frey's slim arboreal carabid, is a species of beetle in the family Carabidae. It is found in Amazonian lowlands near Belém, Brazil.

They are macropterous and capable of flight. Head markedly elongate behind the eyes.

References

Lebiinae
Beetles described in 1961